Frowde is a surname. Notable people with the surname include:

Philip Frowde (died 1738), English poet and dramatist
Henry Frowde